Streetwise: Tiny Revisited is a photography book by Mary Ellen Mark that was published by Aperture in October 2015. The book is a follow-up to Mark's 1988 book Streetwise.

See also 
 Streetwise (1984 film)

References

2015 non-fiction books
American non-fiction books
English-language books
Books of photographs